Nikolay Karamyshev (born 19 January 1989 in Kursk) is a Russian auto racing driver. He has competed in the European Touring Car Cup and will make his debut in the World Touring Car Championship at the 2013 FIA WTCC Race of Russia.

Racing career

Racing in Russia
In 2015 and 2016 Karamyshev won traditional Russian Race of Stars.

World Touring Car Championship
Karamyshev joined Campos Racing for the inaugural FIA WTCC Race of Russia in 2013, replacing Hugo Valente in the team in a two race deal for both the Race of Russia and the Race of Portugal.

European Touring Car Cup
In 2012-2014 Nikolay participated in European Touring Car Cup, in 2012 he was a winner of the Super Production class, and in 2014 he was a champion of the TC2 Turbo class, by winning 6 of 10 races.

Racing record

Complete World Touring Car Championship results
(key) (Races in bold indicate pole position) (Races in italics indicate fastest lap)

References

External links

1989 births
Living people
Sportspeople from Kursk
Russian racing drivers
World Touring Car Championship drivers
European Touring Car Cup drivers
Campos Racing drivers
Russian Circuit Racing Series drivers

TCR Europe Touring Car Series drivers